Backdrop or Bankdrops may refer to:

 Backdrop (theater), painted scenery hung at the back of a stage
 Backdrop (wrestling), various types of throws in amateur and professional wrestling
 Painted photography backdrops, used in studio photography circa 1860-1920
 Backdrop CMS, a website content management system